Arnold de Jode, the son of Pieter de Jode, the younger, was born at Antwerp in 1638. He was instructed in engraving by his father, but he 
never rose above mediocrity. He worked in the Netherlands and in Spain, and was in England in 1666, the year of the Great Fire of London, and in 1667. His best prints are portraits, though they are but indifferent. Among other plates, the following are by him:

Portraits
Cardinal Pallavicini; after Titian.
Catharine Howard, Duchess of Lennox; after van Dyck.
Sir Peter Lely; after Lely.
Alexander Browne; prefixed to his 'Ars Pictoria'; after Huysmans.

Various subjects
The Education of Cupid; after Venus with Mercury and Cupid ('The School of Love') by Correggio. 1667.
The Magdalen; oval; after Van Dyck.
The Infant Christ embracing St. John; after the same; inscribed Arnoldus de Jode, sculp. Londini, tempore incendii maximi.
A Landscape; after L. De Vadder. 1658.
Some other Landscapes; after Jacques Fouquières.

References
 
Pieter de JJode at the RKD database

1638 births
1667 deaths
Artists from Antwerp
17th-century engravers
Flemish engravers